Đorđe Otašević was a Yugoslav basketball player.

Playing career 
During his only season with the Zvezda he won the 1954 Yugoslav Championship. Later, he joined OKK Beograd where he played with Radivoj Korać, Slobodan Gordić, and Miodrag Nikolić. With them he won the 1958 Yugoslav Championship and lost a Yugoslav Cup final in 1959.

Career achievements 
 Yugoslav League champion: 2 (with Crvena zvezda: 1954; with OKK Beograd: 1958)

References

KK Crvena zvezda players
OKK Beograd players
Serbian men's basketball players
Yugoslav men's basketball players
Year of birth missing
Year of death missing
Place of birth missing
Place of death missing